In mathematics, specifically in group theory, two groups are commensurable if they differ only by a finite amount, in a precise sense. The commensurator of a subgroup is another subgroup, related to the normalizer.

Commensurability in group theory
Two groups G1 and G2 are said to be (abstractly) commensurable if there are subgroups H1 ⊂ G1 and H2 ⊂ G2 of finite index such that H1 is isomorphic to H2. For example:
A group is finite if and only if it is commensurable with the trivial group.
Any two finitely generated free groups on at least 2 generators are commensurable with each other. The group SL(2,Z) is also commensurable with these free groups.
Any two surface groups of genus at least 2 are commensurable with each other.

A different but related notion is used for subgroups of a given group. Namely, two subgroups Γ1 and Γ2 of a group G are said to be commensurable if the intersection Γ1 ∩ Γ2 is of finite index in both Γ1 and Γ2. Clearly this implies that Γ1 and Γ2 are abstractly commensurable. 

Example: for nonzero real numbers a and b, the subgroup of R generated by a is commensurable with the subgroup generated by b if and only if the real numbers a and b are commensurable, meaning that a/b belongs to the rational numbers Q.

In geometric group theory, a finitely generated group is viewed as a metric space using the word metric. If two groups are (abstractly) commensurable, then they are quasi-isometric. It has been fruitful to ask when the converse holds.

There is an analogous notion in linear algebra: two linear subspaces S and T of a vector space V are commensurable if the intersection S ∩ T has finite codimension in both S and T.

In topology
Two path-connected topological spaces are sometimes called commensurable if they have homeomorphic finite-sheeted covering spaces.  Depending on the type of space under consideration, one might want to use homotopy equivalences or diffeomorphisms instead of homeomorphisms in the definition. By the relation between covering spaces and the fundamental group, commensurable spaces have commensurable fundamental groups.

Example: the Gieseking manifold is commensurable with the complement of the figure-eight knot; these are both noncompact hyperbolic 3-manifolds of finite volume. On the other hand, there are infinitely many different commensurability classes of compact hyperbolic 3-manifolds, and also of noncompact hyperbolic 3-manifolds of finite volume.

The commensurator
The commensurator of a subgroup Γ of a group G, denoted CommG(Γ), is the set of elements g of G that such that the conjugate subgroup gΓg−1 is commensurable with Γ.  In other words,
 
This is a subgroup of G that contains the normalizer NG(Γ) (and hence contains Γ).

For example, the commensurator of the special linear group SL(n,Z) in SL(n,R) contains SL(n,Q). In particular, the commensurator of SL(n,Z) in SL(n,R) is dense in SL(n,R). More generally, Grigory Margulis showed that the commensurator of a lattice Γ in a semisimple Lie group G is dense in G if and only if Γ is an arithmetic subgroup of G.

The abstract commensurator 

Notes

References

Infinite group theory